Eucalosphaera is a genus of sap beetles in the subfamily Cryptarchinae.

References

External links 

 
 Calosphaera at insectoid.info

Cucujoidea genera
Nitidulidae